The West Virginia Intercollegiate Athletic Conference (WVIAC) was a collegiate athletic conference which historically operated exclusively in the state of West Virginia, but briefly had one Kentucky member in its early years, and expanded into Pennsylvania in its final years. It participated in the Division II ranks of the National Collegiate Athletic Association (NCAA), originally affiliated in the National Association of Intercollegiate Athletics (NAIA) until 1994, but held its final athletic competitions in spring 2013, and officially disbanded on September 1 of that year. Its football-playing members announced in June 2012 that they planned to withdraw to form a new Division II conference at the end of the 2012–13 season; this led to a chain of conference moves that saw all but one of the WVIAC's members find new conference homes.

History
The conference was rated as one of the oldest in intercollegiate athletics, dating back to its founding in 1924 by the West Virginia Department of Education.

In its final school year of 2012–13, the WVIAC offered championships in 16 sports and was headquartered in Princeton, West Virginia.  Men's championships were offered in football, basketball, baseball, track, cross country, soccer, tennis, and golf.  Women's titles were contested in volleyball, softball, basketball, cross country, soccer, track, tennis, and golf.

The WVIAC moved into the NCAA Division II in 1994 after its long affiliation with the NAIA.

Its post-season basketball tournament, which was first conducted in 1936, was at the time of the conference's demise one of the oldest college post-season tournaments in continuous existence—only the Southern Conference men's basketball tournament, established in 1922, was older.

Chronological timeline
 1924 - The West Virginia Intercollegiate Athletic Conference (WVIAC) was founded. Charter members included Alderson College, Bethany College, Broaddus College, Concord State Normal School (now Concord University), Davis & Elkins College, Fairmont State Normal School (now Fairmont State University), Glenville State Normal School (now Glenville State University), the Keyser Preparatory Branch of West Virginia University (now as Potomac State College), Marshall College (now Marshall University), Morris Harvey College (now the University of Charleston), New River State School (now the West Virginia Tech Institute of Technology), Salem College (now Salem University), Shepherd College (now Shepherd University), West Liberty State Teachers College (now West Liberty University), the West Virginia University and West Virginia Wesleyan College beginning the 1924-25 academic year.
 1927 - West Virginia left the WVIAC after the 1926-27 academic year.
 1929 - Morehead State Normal and Teachers College (now Morehead State University) joined the WVIAC in the 1929-30 academic year.
 1932 - Alderson–Broaddus College (now Alderson–Broaddus University) joined the WVIAC due to the merger of both Alderson and Broaddus Colleges in the 1932-33 academic year.
 1933 - Two institutions left the WVIAC to join their respective new home primary conferences: Marshall to the Buckeye Conference and Morehead State to fully align with the Kentucky Intercollegiate Athletic Conference (KIAC) (a second conference they had joined since the 1931-32 academic year), both after the 1932-33 academic year.
 1939 - Marshall re-joined the WVIAC as a non-competing member in the 1939-40 academic year.
 1946 - Mountain State University joined the WVIAC in the 1946-47 academic year.
 1948 - Marshall left the WVIAC for a second time to join the University Division ranks of the National Collegiate Athletic Association (NCAA) and the Ohio Valley Conference (OVC) after the 1947-48 academic year.
 1955 - Bluefield State College and West Virginia State College joined the WVIAC in the 1955-56 academic year.
 1957 - Wheeling Jesuit University joined the WVIAC in the 1957-58 academic year.
 1962 - Bethany left the WVIAC to fully align with the Presidents' Athletic Conference (a second conference they had joined since the 1958-59 academic year) after the 1961-62 academic year.
 1963 - Potomac State left the WVIAC after the 1962-63 academic year.
 1977 - Mountain State left the WVIAC after the 1976-77 academic year.
 1986 - West Virginia Wesleyan left the WVIAC after the 1985-86 academic year.
 1988 - West Virginia Wesleyan re-joined the WVIAC in the 1988-89 academic year.
 1994 - The WVIAC had achieved full membership status within the NCAA Division II ranks after years being mostly affiliated in the National Association of Intercollegiate Athletics (NAIA) in the 1994-95 academic year.
 1999 - Ohio Valley University joined the WVIAC in the 1999-2000 academic year.
 2006 - West Virginia Tech left the WVIAC to return to the NAIA and join the Mid-South Conference after the 2005-06 academic year.
 2006 - The University of Pittsburgh at Johnstown (Pittsburgh–Johnstown) and Seton Hill University joined the WVIAC as provisional members, becoming the first two institutions to join the conference from outside the state of West Virginia since the departure of Morehead in 1933 in the 2006-07 academic year.
 2010 - Salem left the WVIAC to become an NCAA D-II Independent after the 2009-10 academic year.
 2013 - The WVIAC ceased operations as an athletic conference after the 2012-13 academic year; as many schools left to join their respective new home primary conferences beginning the 2013-14 academic year: Alderson–Broaddus, Davis & Elkins and Ohio Valley joined the Great Midwest Athletic Conference (G-MAC); Concord, Charleston, Fairmont State, Glenville State, Shepherd, West Liberty, West Virginia State, West Virginia Wesleyan and Wheeling Jesuit joined alongside Notre Dame College of Ohio (former D-II Independent school), Urbana University (from the G-MAC), and the University of Virginia's College at Wise (from the Mid-South Conference of the NAIA) to form the Mountain East Conference; and Pittsburgh–Johnstown and Seton Hill joined the Pennsylvania State Athletic Conference (PSAC). The only school since the conference's breakup who hadn't still found a new conference home was Bluefield State.

WVIAC breakup 
On June 18, 2012, nine football-playing members of the WVIAC announced they would withdraw from the league to form a new regional all-sports conference.

The WVIAC officially ceased to exist on September 1, 2013. Eight of the nine football-playing members (Concord, Charleston, Fairmont State, Glenville State, Shepherd, West Liberty, West Virginia State, and West Virginia Wesleyan) and one non-football playing member (Wheeling Jesuit) of the conference joined a provisional D-II member from Virginia (UVA-Wise) and two associate Great Lakes Intercollegiate Athletic Conference members from Ohio (Notre Dame and Urbana) to form a new all-sports conference, the Mountain East Conference. Seton Hill and Pitt-Johnstown joined the Pennsylvania State Athletic Conference. Three of the remaining non-football members (Alderson–Broaddus, Davis & Elkins, and Ohio Valley) accepted invitations to join the Great Midwest Athletic Conference. By the end of August 2012, the only WVIAC member without a conference home for 2013–14 was Bluefield State.

Member schools leaving before 2013

Notes

Member schools at breakup

Notes

Membership timeline

References

 
Sports organizations established in 1924
Sports leagues disestablished in 2013
1924 establishments in West Virginia
2013 disestablishments in West Virginia
College sports in Pennsylvania
College sports in West Virginia
Mountain East Conference